The Roman Catholic Diocese of Santo Ângelo is a diocese located in the city of Santo Ângelo in the Ecclesiastical province of Santa Maria in Brazil.

History
 22 May 1961: Established as Diocese of Santo Ângelo from the Diocese of Uruguaiana

Bishops
 Bishops of Santo Ângelo (Roman rite), in reverse chronological order
 Bishop Liro Vendelino Meurer (2013.04.24 - present)
 Bishop José Clemente Weber (2004.06.15 – 2013.04.24)
 Bishop Estanislau Amadeu Kreutz (1973.12.21 – 2004.06.15)
 Bishop Aloísio Lorscheider, O.F.M. (1962.02.03 – 1973.03.26), appointed Archbishop of Fortaleza, Ceara in 1973 (Cardinal in 1976)

Auxiliary bishop
Estanislau Amadeu Kreutz (1972-1973), appointed Bishop here

References
 GCatholic.org
 Catholic Hierarchy

Roman Catholic dioceses in Brazil
Christian organizations established in 1961
Santo Angelo, Roman Catholic Diocese of
Roman Catholic dioceses and prelatures established in the 20th century
1961 establishments in Brazil
Santo Ângelo